Object Holder is the eleventh studio album by the experimental music ensemble Biota, released in 1995 by ReR Megacorp.

Track listing

Personnel 
Adapted from the Object Holder liner notes.

Biota
 James Gardner – piano, flugelhorn, nae แน (hextuple reed instrument)
 Tom Katsimpalis – guitar, clavioline, pump organ
 Susanne Lewis – lead vocals, backing vocals
 Steve Scholbe – bass clarinet, alto saxophone, clarinet, guitar, zither, rubab, Hawaiian tremoloa, hurdy-gurdy
 William Sharp – hurdy-gurdy, tape, engineering
 C.W. Vrtacek – piano
 Gordon H. Whitlow – Rhodes piano, Estey pump organ, accordion, xylophone, guitar, mandolin, whistle
 Larry Wilson – drums, bongos, congas, Madal, Tar, percussion

Additional musicians
 Chris Cutler – electronics and percussion (4, 14, 20, 23)
 Andy Kredt – guitar (12, 19, 23)
 Randy Yeates – keyboards (2, 13, 18), mbira (1)
Production and additional personnel
 Aric Johnson – engineering
 Joan McAninch – engineering
 Randy Miotke – engineering
 Dirk Vallons – design

Release history

References

External links 
 

1995 albums
Biota (band) albums
Recommended Records albums